Bakultala is a village near Rangat. It has an Industrial Training Institution or ITI. It has mangroves because it is not very far from the sea. It comprises a number of smaller villages such as Shyamkund, Kalshi, Laxmanpur, Shaktigarh, and Kausalya Nagar.

The residents are mainly fishermen and farmers.  Farmers cultivate mainly rice, vegetables, and lentils. There is a government senior secondary school and a government health sub-centre.

The area once had a wood industry.

The population is mainly Bengali, having settled decades ago.

The place can be reached by bus from the capital Port Blair in five hours.

Villages in North and Middle Andaman district